Mata (lit. Grove) is a moshav in central Israel. Located in the Jerusalem corridor near Beit Shemesh, it falls under the jurisdiction of Mateh Yehuda Regional Council.

Etymology
"The name mata is also hinted at in Ezekiel (XXXIV, 29)": I will provide for them a grove.

History
The village was established in 1950 by immigrants from Yemen on land that had formerly belonged to the depopulated Palestinian villages of Allar and Khirbat al-Tannur. The founders were later joined by more immigrants from North Africa.

Archaeology

Along the old Roman Road (now regional highway 375) are the ruins of a travelers' inn and livery stable, now called "khanut" (formerly, Khirbet el-Khan). A mosaic floor with Greek writing of a Byzantine type can still be seen in the remains of the structure, believed to have been used as a church in the 6th century. 

In the 12th century, a rural monastery was established there by the Crusaders consisting of several barrel-vaulted buildings, an enclosure wall and a chapel. 

Charles Clermont-Ganneau describes the ruins of a church (el-K'niseh), partially standing, in the valley below (Wadi et Tannur), and which he thought to be of medieval origin. 

In the valley are various types of trees: Sweet and bitter almonds, olives, grapes, pomegranates, lemons, figs, walnuts, Syrian pears, carobs and hawthorns. To the south-east of the moshav is a natural spring called `Ain Jurish named after a nearby small Arab village (now abandoned) and which was built on the spur of a hill near the town of Tzur Hadassah (Har Kitron). Rock-carved niches used as tombs can still be seen in the abandoned village.

Landmarks
To the west of the moshav is Wadi Tannur, a riverine gulch with two natural springs - Ein Mata (Spring of the Orchard) and Ein Tannur.

At the foot of Ein Tannur ("Oven Spring") is an ancient tunnel dug deeply to catch the water at the source and increase its flow - a spring-flow tunnel. According to a local legend, Noah's oven was located nearby before the flood. When God destroyed the world, Noah's oven began spouting water, proving Noah's great commitment to God. When the flood was over and the water subsided, the oven forgot its original purpose and water continued to flow from it. When Noah passed by in his ark, he only saw the spring rather than his oven, so he continued his journey and finally landed on Mount Ararat.

Further reading
 Shlomo Shwartz, New People in the High Mountains (אנשים חדשים בהרים הגבוהים), Hakibbutz Hameuchad, 1953 (Hebrew) - stories of the first settlers in Mata (Allar Aleph)

Gallery

References

External links
 Mata in Antiquity Archaeological Survey of Israel

Moshavim
Populated places established in 1950
Populated places in Jerusalem District
Yemeni-Jewish culture in Israel
1950 establishments in Israel